The great blue turaco (Corythaeola cristata) is a bird species of the  family Musophagidae. At  in length, it is the largest species of turaco. The male and female have similar plumage. It is widespread throughout the African tropical rainforest.

Taxonomy
French ornithologist Louis Vieillot described the great blue turaco as Musophaga cristata in 1816, before German ornithologist Ferdinand Heine placed in its own genus in 1860.

The great blue turaco is the sole member of the subfamily Corythaeolinae within the turaco family. Its closest relatives are the go-away birds and plantain eaters of the genus Crinifer. The common ancestor of both diverged from the ancestor of all other turaco species.

"Great blue turaco" has been designated the official common name by the International Ornithologists' Union (IOC). It is also called blue plantain eater.

Description
The adult great blue turaco has predominantly gray-blue upperparts with an upright blue-black crest, white chin, yellow-green lower breast and yellow belly darkening to chestnut brown posteriorly. The undertail coverts are chestnut, and undertail black and yellowish. The yellow bill has an orange-red tip, the eyes are brown, and surrounded by a ring of black bare skin. The legs and feet are black with yellow soles. The sexes have similar plumage.

Distribution and habitat
The species ranges from Guinea in the west, east across the sub-Saharan nations to the Imatong Mountains in southern Sudan; it is also observed in Uganda, Tanzania and western Kenya, south to the Democratic Republic of Congo and Angola. It inhabits rainforest and gallery forest. It has adapted to areas cleared by humans and can thrive in these areas.

Behaviour
The great blue turaco is gregarious, with birds forming small troops of six or seven individuals.

Feeding
The great blue turaco eats leaves, flowers, as well as fruit of many plant species, including those of the genera Musanga, Cissus, Ficus (such as Ficus capensis) Polyalthia, Heisteria, Dacryodes, Pachypodanthium, Uapaca, Strombosia, Trichilia, Drypetes, Viscum, Beilschmiedia, Coelocaryon, Croton, and Pycnanthus. In Kenya, it has been recorded eating mitzeeri (Bridelia micrantha) in April, loquat (Eriobotrya japonica)  in July, guava (Psidium guajava) in September and Cordia africana over November and December. Fieldwork in Rwanda revealed leaves constituted around 25% of its diet, being eaten more often when there are less fruit. The species also plays a role in seed dispersal as it generally passes seed in its feces some distance from parent trees.

Breeding
Both sexes incubate the clutch of two (rarely one or three) eggs over 29–31 days. The eggs are white or greenish white and almost round, measuring 46–50 mm by 41–43 mm (1.8–2.0 in by 1.6–1.7 in).

Interactions with humans
Highly regarded as food in west Africa, it is often hunted and eaten by local people. The BaMbala and related tribes around the town of Kikwit in the DRC, call the great blue turaco kolonvo. The meat is popular in smaller villages, and the long tail feathers are prized for decorations. The Mbuti people of the Ituri Rainforest in the Democratic Republic of the Congo tell of the great blue turaco (which they call kulkoko) as linked with okapi, telling them of danger. They also believe that eating the species while pregnant may result in a difficult delivery or birth deformity. It is also a clan totem animal and as such, cannot be eaten by members of that clan; if they do eat it their teeth are said to fall out.

References

External links
 

great blue turaco
Birds of the African tropical rainforest
Birds of the Gulf of Guinea
great blue turaco
great blue turaco